Utica station may refer to:

Union Station (Utica, New York)
Utica station (Buffalo Metro Rail)